This List of reptiles of Nepal presents reptile species recorded in Nepal.

Order: Crocodilia 

Family: Crocodilidae 
 Mugger crocodile (Crocodylus palustris)

Family: Gavialiidae
 Gharial (Gavialis gangeticus)

Order: Testudines 
Family: Testudinidae
 Elongated tortoise (Indotestudo elongata)

Family: Geoemydidae
 Red-crowned roofed turtle (Batagur kachuga)
 Three-striped roofed turtle (Batagur dhongoka)
 Black pond turtle (Geoclemys hamiltonii)
 Brown roofed turtle (Pangshura smithii)
 Tricarinate hill turtle (Melanochelys tricarinata)
 Indian black turtle (Melanochelys trijuga)
 Indian roofed turtle (Pangshura tecta)
 Indian tent turtle (Pangshura tentoria)
 Brahminy river turtle (Hardella thurjii)
 Assam leaf turtle (Cyclemys gemeli)
 Indian eyed turtle (Morenia petersi)
Family: Trionychidae
 Indian softshell turtle (Nilssonia gangetica)
 Indian peacock softshell turtle (Nilssonia hurum) 
 Indian narrow-headed softshell turtle (Chitra indica)
 Indian flapshell turtle (Lissemys punctata)

Order: Squamata

Suborder: Lacertilia 

Family: Gekkonidae
 Baluch rock gecko (Bunopus tuberculatus)
 Flat-tailed house gecko (Hemidactylus platyurus)
 Indo-Pacific gecko (Hemidactylus garnotii)
 Brook's house gecko (Hemidactylus brookii)
 Northern house gecko (Hemidactylus flaviviridis)
 Tokay gecko (Gekko gekko)
 Spotted house gecko (Gekko monarchus)
 Nepalese rock gecko (Cyrtodactylus nepalensis)
 Himalayan bent-toed gecko (Cyrtodactylus himalayanus)
Family: Eublepharidae
 Common leopard gecko (Eublepharis macularius)

Family: Agamidae
 Oriental garden lizard (Calotes versicolor)
 Kashmir rock agama (Laudakia tuberculata)
 Variegated mountain lizard (Japalura variegata)
 Dark sitana (Sitana fusca)
 Siwalik sitana ( Sitana sivalensis)

Family: Scincidae
 Bronze grass skink (Eutropis macularia)
 Many-keeled grass skink (Eutropis carinata)
 Striped grass mabuya (Eutropis dissimilis)
 Ladakh supple skink (Asymblepharus ladacensis)
 Sikkim ground skink (Asymblepharus sikimmensis)
 Reeve's smooth skink (Scincella reevesii)
 Large ground skink (Scincella capitenea)
 Indian forest skink (Sphenomorphus indicus)
 Spotted forest skink (Sphenomorphus maculatus)
 White-spotted supple skink (Lygosoma albopunctatum)
 Common snake skink (Lygosoma punctara)

Family: Varanidae
 Bengal monitor (Varanus bengalensis)
 Yellow monitor (Varanus flavescens)

Suborder: Anguimorpha
Family: Anguidae
 Asian glass lizard (Dopasia gracilis)

Suborder: Serpentes 
Family: Boidae
 Russell's boa (Eryx conicus)
 Red sand boa ( Eryx johnii)

Family: Pythonidae
 Indian rock python (Python molurus)
 Burmese python (Python bivittatus)

Family: Elapidae
 Common krait (Bungarus caeruleus)
 Banded krait (Bungarus fasciatus)
 Northeastern hill krait (Bungarus bungaroides)
 Lesser black krait (Bunagrus lividus)
 Greater black krait (Bungarus niger)
 Sind krait (Bungarus sindanus)
 MacClelland's coral snake (Sinomicrurus macclellandi)
 Spectacled cobra (Naja naja)
 Monocled cobra (Naja kaouthia)
 King cobra (Ophiophagus hannah)

Family: Typhlopidae
 Brahminy blind snake (Indotyphlops braminus)
Family: 	Gerrhopilidae
 Wall's worm snake (Gerrhopilus oligolepis)

Family: Viperidae
 Himalayan pit viper (Gloydius himalayanus)
 Saw-scaled viper (Echis carinatus)
 White-lipped pit viper (Trimeresurus albolabris)
 Common green pit viper (Trimeresurus gramineus)
 Tibetan bamboo pit viper (Trimeresurus tibetanus)
 Chinese pit viper (Trimeresurus stejnegeri)
 Large-eyed pitviper (Trimeresurus macrops)
 Russell's viper (Daboia russelii)
 Mountain pitviper (Ovophis monticola)
 Oriental pit viper (Protobothrops jerdonii)
 Strauch's pitviper (Gloydius strauchi)

Family: Colubridae
 Checkered keelback (Fowlea piscator)
 St. John's keelback  (Fowlea sanctijohannis)
 Indian egg-eating snake (Elachistodon westermanni)
 Red-necked keelback (Rhabdophis subminiatus)
 Oriental ratsnake (Ptyas mucosa)
 Green rat snake (Ptyas nigromarginata)
 Radiated ratsnake (Coelognathus radiatus)
 Trinket snake (Coelognathus helena)
 Oriental wolf snake (Lycodon capucinus)
 Indian wolf snake (Lycodon aulicus)
 Northern wolf snake (Lycodon striatus)
 Banded kukri snake (Oligodon arnensis)
 Cantor's kukri snake (Oligodon cyclurus)
 Banded racer (Argyrogena fasciolata)
 Beauty rat snake (Elaphe taeniura)
 Eastern trinket snake (Elaphe cantoris)
 Hodgson's rat snake (Elaphe hodgsoni)
 Forsten's cat snake (Boiga forsteni)
 Green cat snake (Boiga cyanea)
 Common cat snake (Boiga trigonata)
 Tawny cat snake (Boiga ochracea)
 Buff striped keelback (Amphiesma stolatum)
 Painted keelback (Xenochrophis cerasogaster)
 Orange-collared keelback (Rhabdophis himalayanus)
 Cantor's black-headed snake (Sibynophis sagittarius)
 Sikkim keelback (Herpetoreas sieboldii)
 Himalayan keelback (Herpetoreas platyceps)
 Blackbelly worm-eating snake (Trachischium fuscum)
 Rosebelly worm-eating snake (Trachischium guentheri)
 Mountain worm-eating snake (Trachischium monticola)
 Olive oriental worm-eating snake (Trachischium laeve)
 Yellowbelly worm-eating snake (Trachischium tenuiceps)

References

External links 
 Reptile database
 Indian snake checklist
 Herpetology in South Asia

Reptiles
Nepal

Nepal